MF  Tin Ujević is a vehicle and passenger cruiseferry owned and operated by Jadrolinija, the Croatian state-owned ferry company. It was built in September 2002 at the Kanellos Bros shipyard in Athens, Greece. In the summer of 2003 Jadrolinija bought it for 7.5 million euros, and introduced her on 4 July 2003 on the Split—Stari Grad route. As of June 2010 it also serves on the Split—Supetar route.

MF Tin Ujević has a capacity of 1,000 passengers and 200 cars and maximum speed is 14.0 knots.

References

External links
MF Tin Ujević at the Jadrolinija official website  
MF Tin Ujević at Ferry-Site.dk

Ferries of Croatia
Ships built in Greece
2002 ships